Vince Williams (July 11, 1957 – January 6, 1997) was an American actor from Natchitoches, Louisiana, best known for his role as "Hampton Speakes" on Guiding Light, which he played from 1989 to 1995.

He moved on to Another World, playing the role of "Dustin Carter" from late 1996 until his death at age 39 from colon cancer.

External links

1957 births
1997 deaths
American male soap opera actors
20th-century American male actors